The West African swallow (Cecropis domicella) is a swallow. It is found in Africa from Senegal to eastern Sudan.

Taxonomy and systematics
The West African swallow was originally described in the genus Hirundo. Some authorities consider it to be a subspecies of the red-rumped swallow. Alternate names for the West African swallow include the lowland swallow, Senegal red-rumped swallow and West African striated swallow.

References

West African swallow
West African swallow
Taxa named by Theodor von Heuglin